Kim Hye-song (born September 8, 1997) is a North Korean female acrobatic gymnast. With partner Jong Kum-hwa, Kim achieved 5th in the 2014 Acrobatic Gymnastics World Championships.

References

1997 births
Living people
North Korean acrobatic gymnasts
Female acrobatic gymnasts